Ralph Fenton "Joe" Dawson (March 9, 1897 – January 4, 1978) was a Major League Baseball pitcher who played for four seasons starting at the age of 27. He played for the Cleveland Indians in 1924 and the Pittsburgh Pirates from 1927 to 1929. He was born in Bow, Washington and grew up in North Vancouver, British Columbia.

His brother, Rex, had a brief stint in the Majors.

References

External links

1897 births
1978 deaths
Cleveland Indians players
Pittsburgh Pirates players
Baseball players from Washington (state)
Baseball people from British Columbia
People from Bow, Washington